The Museum of Antiquities Aruba is a museum in Paradera in the outskirts of Oranjestad in Aruba. The museum covers from the preceramic era to the 20th century.

See also 
 List of museums in Aruba

References 

Museums in Aruba